Hugh MacDonald may refer to:
 Hugh MacDonald (poet) (born 1945), Canadian poet
 Hugh MacDonald (Vicar Apostolic of the Highland District) (1699–1773), Roman Catholic bishop
 Hugh MacDonald (bishop of Aberdeen) (1841–1898), Roman Catholic bishop
 Hugh MacDonald (filmmaker), film director, nominated for an Academy Award for Animated Short Film
 Hugh MacDonald (archer) (born 1974), Canadian archer
 Hugh MacDonald (Canadian politician) (born 1955), Canadian politician
 Hugh MacDonald (Scottish politician) (1929–2013), Scottish nationalist activist
 Hugh MacDonald (journalist) (1817–1860), Scottish journalist, author and poet
 Hugh Macdonald (born 1940), English musicologist
 Hugh John Macdonald (1850–1929), former Premier of Manitoba
 Hugh John MacDonald (Alberta politician) (1911–1998), Member of the Legislative Assembly of Alberta, 1948–1959
 Hugh John Macdonald (Edmonton politician) (1898–1965), provincial politician from Alberta, Canada
 H. Ian Macdonald (born 1929), Canadian economist, civil servant, and former President of York University
 Hugh Macdonald (Australian politician) (1850–1906), member of the New South Wales Legislative Assembly

See also 
 Hugh McDonald (disambiguation)